The Plaquemine Ferry is a ferry across the Mississippi River in the U.S. state of Louisiana, connecting Plaquemine and Sunshine. The ferry has a current capacity of 35 standard vehicles and operates on the half hour schedule.

See also
List of crossings of the Lower Mississippi River

References

External links
Louisiana Department of Transportation and Development, Locations and Characteristics of Ferries

Ferries of the Mississippi River
Ferries of Louisiana